Mastodon was the unofficial name of the Central Pacific Railroad's number 229, the world's first successful 4-8-0 steam locomotive.

History and career
The engine was designed and built by the road's master mechanic, Andrew Jackson "A.J" Stevens at Sacramento Locomotive Works in 1882. The locomotive had two highly unusual features: the firebox shape and the steam distribution.  The only other locomotives to use such a valve gear were the 20 copies of Mastodon (see below) and CPR #237 El Gobernador. All other steam locomotives with slide valves had just a single valve in the center.

 After being readied for its initial shakedown run, the engine met with a minor mishap in which its large "balloon" stack was knocked away from the boiler. During all the careful preparations, apparently nobody noticed that the stack was nearly  taller than the doors to the roundhouse. The problem was fixed and an impressive series of trials on the steep grades of the Sierra Nevada soon followed, in which it easily outperformed the smaller 4-4-0 and 4-6-0 engines used by the railroad in those days. The success of this engine inspired railroad president Leland Stanford to instruct Stevens to build an even larger locomotive, which would be the largest the world had ever seen up until that time. This engine, a 4-10-0 named El Gobernador (CPRR #237), looked virtually identical to Mastodon'', with the exception of being longer and having an additional pair of driving wheels. Unfortunately, this engine, unlike its predecessor, was doomed to failure and was scrapped in 1894.

Sometime in the early 20th century, No. 229 (now renumbered as Southern Pacific 2925) was converted from wood to oil-firing and was later assigned to the Oregon lines. Despite its historical significance, the engine was broken up for scrap at the Brooklyn Shops in Portland, Oregon, in June 1935 after a working life of 53 years.

See also 
 Expansion valve

References 

 

Southern Pacific Railroad locomotives
4-8-0 locomotives
Steam locomotives of the United States
Railway locomotives introduced in 1882
Scrapped locomotives
Standard gauge locomotives of the United States